Saint-Ouen-des-Alleux is a commune in the Ille-et-Vilaine department in Brittany in northwestern France.

Geography

The adjacent communes are Saint-Christophe-de-Valains, Le Tiercent, Saint-Hilaire-des-Landes, Saint-Marc-sur-Couesnon, Mézières-sur-Couesnon, and Vieux-Vy-sur-Couesnon.

Population
Inhabitants of Saint-Ouen-des-Alleux are called audonniens in French.

International relations
Saint-Ouen-des-Alleux is twinned with:
 St Gennys, Cornwall, England

See also
Communes of the Ille-et-Vilaine department

References

External links

 Geography of Brittany
 The page of the commune on infobretagne.com
 
Mayors of Ille-et-Vilaine Association 

Communes of Ille-et-Vilaine